The GAZ-3310 Valdai is a medium-class flat bed truck (category N2 MCV) formerly produced from late 2004 until 2015 at the Gorky Automobile Plant in Russia. It differs from the "GAZelle" light commercial vehicle in that it does require a category C driver's license. The production of the truck ended in December 2015.

Manufacturing history 

After the economic collapse in the late 1990s, the Gorky Automobile Plant cartel (along with AMO), created a flat-bed trailer to transport medium duty trucks in response to market demand. The first models were created in conjunction with MAZ. Minsk residents later refused to supply their GAZ type MAZ-5336, and instead launched a family of five-ton, low loader trucks; the MAZ-4370 "Zubrenic". GAZ had to develop their own cabin, because available cabins did not suit their needs. Eventually these cabins were used as the basis for the popular "GAZelle" (GAZ-3302). GAZ has produced two engine types: a compact, 4-cylinder engine and an inline six-cylinder diesel GAZ-562 (License Steyr).

Despite its protruding engine cover, the modified engine compartment provided room for a second passenger within the cabin and is listed as "conditional triple" for short and long distances. The GAZ-3310 used modern teardrop-shaped headlights as well as a hood, grill and an integrated bumper, each of which have been modified. The prototype four-ton GAZ-3310, titled "Valdai", debuted at the Moscow International Automobile Salon in 1999. In 2003, "Valdai" began the mass production of block headlights which assisted in the restyling of their commercial "Gazelle" and "Sable" vehicles. The "Valdai" type chassis - a 5-ton diesel truck (GAZ-4301) - was modified with reversed front suspension; it introduced new front and rear axles, and low-profile tires. The braking system was originally only air, but was refined to allow the installation of an automatic braking system (ABS). The entire set of design modifications allowed for the creation of a modern truck with a low-loading height (1000 mm), comfortable suspension, an advanced braking system, and an economical diesel engine.

The "Valdai" was offered with a choice of multiple engines: a diesel MMZ D-245.7, a gas (Steyr)-562, a Cummins 3.9 140 CIV, and an IVECO-8143, SOFIM. For economic reasons, preference was given to the Minsk D-245.7 modification (GAZ-33104). In 2006, production began on a 4-meter wheelbase version of the GAZ-331041. At the Moscow International Motor Show, an experimental version (GAZ-43483) was shown containing a reinforced chassis (GVW 8.5 tons and double) and a cabin designed for long-distance transport, together with a chassis for prospective models of small buses. In 2004–2006, the "Valdai" was created by experienced Russian makers of small buses (KAvZ - 32081 and PAZ-3202). Ukraine serially produced the small bus Galaz-3207, cars and the fire vehicle "Killer Whale".  In November 2010, GAZ announced the launch of 4-ton version GAZ-33106 with a Cummins ISF 3.8 engine.

In late December 2015 with the last truck "Valdai" was produced. It was replaced by a new city 5-ton delivery truck GAZon NEXT City with low-profile wheels and low loading height, the production of which was launched in mid-2015.

Versions

Specifications (end of 2010) 
 The cabin seats three persons or six with double cabin version.

GAZ-33104 
 Engine - MMZ D-245.7E-3
 Engine type - inline 4-cylinder, 4-stroke diesel engine with liquid-cooled, turbocharged and intercooler, direct fuel injection.
 Displacement, 4.75 litres
 Compression ratio - 15:1
 Rated output kW - 119 hp @ 2400rpm
 Maximum torque - 420Nm @ 1400rpm
 Dressed weight - 3545 kg
 Gross weight  - 7400 kg
 Load capacity - 4 tons
 Maximum speed - 95 km/h
 Acceleration time to 80 km/h - 45s
 Average fuel consumption, l/100 km
 at a speed of 60 km/h - 13
 at a speed of 80 km/h - 18

GAZ-33106 
 Engine - Cummins ISF
 Engine Type - inline 4-cylinder, 4-stroke diesel engine, liquid-cooled, turbocharged and intercooled, direct fuel injection.
 Displacement, 3.76 litres
 Rated output kW 112 hp @ 2600rpm
 Maximum torque - 491 hp @ 1200-1900rpm
 Dressed weight - 3350 kg
 Gross weight - 7400 kg
 Maximum speed - 105 km/h
 Acceleration time to 80 km/h - 40s
 Average fuel consumption, l/100 km
 at a speed of 60 km/h - 12
 at a speed of 80 km/h - 15

References

External links 

 GAZ Valdai on GAZ plant website 
 GAZ Valdai on GAZ Group website 
 GAZ Production System 

GAZ Group trucks
Vehicles introduced in 2004
Rear-wheel-drive vehicles